Pentarthrum blackburni was a species of beetle in family Curculionidae. It was endemic to Hawaii.

Sources 

†
Beetles described in 1878
Endemic fauna of Hawaii
Extinct Hawaiian animals
Extinct beetles
Taxonomy articles created by Polbot